A Ghetto Dream is the second album by female rapper Rasheeda. The album was originally scheduled to be released on Motown but after parting ways with that label, A Ghetto Dream was released in March 2002 by D-Lo Entertainment. No singles were released and the album failed to chart.

Track listing
 "It's Alright" – 4:30
 "Let's Get 2 It" (remix) (featuring Pastor Troy) – 4:10
  "We Ready" (featuring Archie) – 4:08
 "Jumpsides" (featuring Kelly) – 4:22
 "Like Us" (featuring Menace) – 4:32
 "Who U Is" (featuring Baby D, 404 Soldierz, and Noodoz) – 4:12
 "Watch Ya Self" – 4:26
 "Let's Get 2 It" – 4:10
 "Do It" (remix) (featuring Pastor Troy, Cap One, and Que Bo Gold) – 3:51
 "Say What Cha Want" – 4:01
 "No Parkin" – 4:12
 "You Got Me Fucked Up" (featuring Manchild) – 3:34
 "Get Buck" (featuring Cap One) – 3:06
 "2 Nite" (featuring Lil Jon & The Eastside Boyz) – 3:53
 "On Dem Thangs" (featuring Danah) – 3:42
 "I Got a Problem"/"Don't Stop" (featuring Da Kaperz) – 8:30

2002 albums
Rasheeda albums